Rodrigo Luiz Angelotti (born 27 April 1998), sometimes known as just Rodrigo is a Brazilian football player who plays as a Forward or Winger. He currently play for Omiya Ardija, on loan from Kashiwa Reysol.

Club career
Rodrigo begin first youth career with Red Bull Brasil until 2016.

He made his first professional career with Red Bull Brasil and debut for Campeonato Paulista on 5 February 2017 in a game against Mirassol.

In July 2017, after a trial period with Red Bull Salzburg, he joined another Austrian club FC Liefering for a season-long loan.

Rodrigo became a Red Bull Bragantino player when Red Bull Brasil merged with Clube Atlético Bragantino in April 2019.

On 15 January 2021, Angelotti abroad to Japan and signed transfer to J1 club, Kashiwa Reysol for ahead of 2021 season. The jersey number is 29. On 24 April of the same year, he made his first appearance in the J. League in his J1 Matchweek 11 against Tokushima Vortis. Also, on 5 May, he scored his first goal after coming to Japan in the 5th round of the YBC Levain Cup Group Stage against Urawa Reds.

On 8 January 2023, Angelotti was loaned to J2 club, Omiya Ardija for ahead of 2023 season.

References

External links
 

1998 births
Living people
Brazilian footballers
Brazilian expatriate footballers
Association football midfielders
Red Bull Brasil players
Red Bull Bragantino players
FC Liefering players
Ituano FC players
Kashiwa Reysol players
Omiya Ardija players
Campeonato Brasileiro Série D players
2. Liga (Austria) players
J1 League players
J2 League players
Brazilian expatriate sportspeople in Austria
Brazilian expatriate sportspeople in Japan
Expatriate footballers in Austria
Expatriate footballers in Japan